Ed Lange (1920 - 1995)  was a nudist photographer, and a publisher of many nudist pamphlets and magazines showing the nudist lifestyle.


As well as founding the publisher Elysium Growth Press, he was the founder and president of the Elysium Institute in Topanga Canyon, California, and a Vice-President of the International Naturist Federation. His free love ideals placed him in the sexual revolution movement of the 1960s and 1970s. He also was very active in the Western Sunbathing Association and in the first stirrings of the Free Beach movement in the 1960s in California. Lange was originally a fashion photographer who worked for Vogue, Harper's Bazaar and Life magazines as well as a studio photographer at Paramount and Conde Nast in Los Angeles.

A few months before his death, he was named Citizen of the Year by the Topanga Chamber of Commerce.

Books

Family Naturism in Europe: A Nudist Pictorial Classic by Ed Lange 
Family Naturism in America: A Nudist Pictorial Classic by Ed Lange 
Fun in the Sun: Nudist and Naturist Living  by Ed Lange (editor)
"N" Is for Naked (Paperback) by Ed Lange
Nudist Magazines of the 50s & 60s (The Nudist Nostalgia Series, Book 1) by Ed Lange, Stan Sohler.  (pbk.: bk. 1)
Nudist Magazines of the 50s & 60s (The Nudist Nostalgia Series, Book 2) by Ed Lange, Stan Sohler.  (pbk.: bk. 2)
Nudist Magazines of the 50s & 60s (The Nudist Nostalgia Series, Book 3) by Ed Lange, Stan Sohler.  (pbk.: bk. 3)
Nudist Magazines of the 50s & 60s (The Nudist Nostalgia Series, Book 4) by Ed Lange, Stan Sohler.  (pbk.: bk. 4)
Nudist Nudes by Ed Lange

Magazines

"Ankh"
"Exposure & Design"
"Nude Lark" (evolved from "Nude Look")
"Nude Look"
"Nude Living"
"Nude Photography"
"Nudism Today"
"Nudist Adventure"
"Nudist Holiday"
"Sundial"
"Sundisk" (evolved from "Sundial")
"Sunrise"
"The Nudist Idea"
"Young and Naked"

See also
The American Association for Nude Recreation (AANR)
Clothes free organizations
List of public outdoor clothes free places
Naturism
Nudism
Nudity in sport
Public nudity
Skinny dipping

References

External links
 http://articles.latimes.com/keyword/ed-lange
 http://www.paperbackswap.com/Ed-Lange/author/

Social nudity advocates
1920 births
1995 deaths
People from Topanga, California
Activists from California
Photographers from California